The Sánchez Ramírez is the male volleyball team of Sánchez Ramírez.

History
The team was founded in 2007.

Current volleyball squad
As of December 2008

Coach:  Vicente Paniagua

Assistant coach:  Jose Evangelista

References

External links
League Official website

Dominican Republic volleyball clubs
Volleyball clubs established in 2007